The Roman Catholic Diocese of Ponta de Pedras is a diocese located in the city of Ponta de Pedras in the Ecclesiastical province of Belém do Pará in Brazil.

History
 June 25, 1963: Established as Territorial Prelature of Ponta de Pedras from Metropolitan Archdiocese of Belém do Pará
 October 16, 1979: Promoted as Diocese of Ponta de Pedras

Bishops

Ordinaries (in reverse chronological order)
 Bishops of Ponta de Pedras (Roman rite)
 Bishop Teodoro Mendes Tavares, C.S.Sp. (2015.09.23 - )
 Bishop Alessio Saccardo, S.J. (2002.01.16 – 2015.09.23)
 Bishop Angelo Maria Rivato, S.J. (83) (1979.10.16 – 2002.01.16)
 Prelates of Ponta de Pedras (Roman rite)
 Bishop Angelo Maria Rivato, S.J. (1965.04.29 – 1979.10.16)

Coadjutor bishop
Teodoro Mendes Tavares, C.S.Sp. (2015)

Sources
 GCatholic.org
 Catholic Hierarchy

Roman Catholic dioceses in Brazil
Christian organizations established in 1963
Ponta de Pedras, Roman Catholic Diocese of
Roman Catholic dioceses and prelatures established in the 20th century